ELQ-300 is an experimental antimalarial medication. It is the first entry in a new class of antimalarials known as 4-quinolone-3-diarylethers.

ELQ-300 acts as an inhibitor of the mitochondrial cytochrome bc1 complex (complex III in the electron transport chain) - A mechanism shared with some of the most potent fungicides known, the strobilurins. In preclinical studies with mice, ELQ-300 was found to be highly active against Plasmodium falciparum and Plasmodium vivax at all life cycle stages that play a role in the transmission of malaria, and to have good oral bioavailability.

References

Further reading

Antimalarial agents
4-Quinolones
Trifluoromethyl ethers
Diphenyl ethers
Hydroquinone ethers
Chloroarenes